is a Japanese superhero manga series written and illustrated by Negi Haruba. It has been serialized in Kodansha's Weekly Shōnen Magazine since February 2021, with its chapters collected into eight  volumes . An anime television series adaptation has been announced.

Plot
Thirteen years ago, the Villainous Army of evil attempted to invade Earth, faced by the super sentai squadron known as the Dragon Keepers, and their super weapons, the Divine Tools. The evil army, however, was defeated within a year, all of its executives wiped out, and the surviving (and almost immortal) foot soldiers have been forced ever since to reenact their defeat to the Keepers in front of a crowd of spectators every Sunday. Tired of the charade, and realizing that this amounts to little more than slavery, one of the foot soldiers rebels, and decides he will defeat the Dragon Keepers by infiltrating the organization.

Characters

Main

A rebellious foot soldier from the villainous army in the sky fortress that arrived 13 years ago, he is a duster with transformative and regeneration abilities alongside his fellow foot soldiers who vowed to defeat the Dragon Keepers by infiltrating their organization and ranks. He takes on two disguises for most of the series; one is an appearance of an average black haired teenage guy, and the other as Hibiki so he can use his identity to infiltrate their ranks easier.
 
A Junior First-Class ranked Ranger from the Yellow Battalion, who has a mysterious grudge against the Dragon Keepers. She and D made an alliance together to collect their divine tools and plans kill them, though her background and motives remains unknown.

An inspiring independent ranger cadet who is aware of the Keeper's corruption but wishes to fix their system by bringing back to their original justice sense. Following an attack to cover D, he swap places with him after becoming disfigured while D carries on using his identity for most of the series. His current whereabouts remain unknown.

Rangers

Dragon Keepers
 
The leader of the Dragon Keepers and commander of the Red Battalion who seemed to be friendly and inspiring outside, but is actually cruel who does not hold back against others when something needs to be done.
 
The Blue Keeper and commander of the Blue Battalion. Originally in a gang to raise money for an orphanage, he joined the rangers after Akabane blackmails him between jail. He was killed by Peltrola's sneak attack in a battle with D.
 
The Pink Keeper and commander of the Pink Battalion who's also Hibiki's older sister, in which she has an obsession on. When un-transfomed, it is revealed she is crippled, who lost her legs 13 years ago where she got caught up in Peltrola's battle, and had to rely on a wheelchair.
 
The Green Keeper and commander of the Green Battalion.

The Yellow Keeper and commander of the Yellow Battalion.

Villainous Army

Executives

A surviving Executive of the Villainous Army who resides in the Blue Garrison.

A surviving Executive of the Villainous Army who resides in a school by trapping it in a loop.

Dusters

A stray female foot soldier who left the fortress and resides in Hibiki's room who befriends D.

Production
On October 27, 2020, Negi Haruba started recruiting regular assistants for his coming new series. On December 23, 2020, it was announced that Negi Haruba would start his new manga series Go! Go! Loser Ranger! on February 3, 2021.

Media

Manga
Go! Go! Loser Ranger! is written and illustrated by Negi Haruba. The manga series began its serialization in Kodansha's Weekly Shōnen Magazine in the 10th issue published on February 3, 2021. Kodansha has collected its chapters into individual  volumes. The first volume was released on April 16, 2021. As of March 16, 2023, nine volumes have been released. In November 2021, during their panel at Anime NYC, Kodansha USA announced their license to the series and would release it in both print and digital.

Volume list

{{Graphic novel list
|VolumeNumber    = 6
|RelDate         = July 15, 2022
|ISBN            = 978-4-06-528429-2
|LicensedRelDate = August 22, 2023
|LicensedISBN    = 978-1-64-651828-9
|ChapterList     =

|ShortSummary    =
}}
{{Graphic novel list
|VolumeNumber    = 7
|RelDate         = October 17, 2022
|ISBN            = 978-4-06-529432-1
|LicensedRelDate = October 24, 2023
|LicensedISBN    = 978-1-64-651894-4
|ChapterList     =

|ShortSummary    =
}}
{{Graphic novel list
|VolumeNumber    = 8
|RelDate         = December 16, 2022
|ISBN            = 978-4-06-529941-8
|LicensedRelDate = —
|LicensedISBN    = 
|ChapterList     =

|ShortSummary    =
}}
{{Graphic novel list
|VolumeNumber    = 9
|RelDate         = March 16, 2023
|ISBN            = 978-4-06-530920-9
|LicensedRelDate = —
|LicensedISBN    = 
|ChapterList     =

|ShortSummary    =
}}

Anime
An anime television series adaptation directed by Keiichi Sato was announced on December 6, 2022.

Reception
In June 2021, Go! Go! Loser Ranger! was nominated for the seventh Next Manga Award in the Best Printed Manga category.

Notes

References

External links 
 
 

Anime series based on manga
Kodansha manga
Shochiku
Shōnen manga
Superheroes in anime and manga
Tokusatsu television series
Upcoming anime television series